Terrence Elton Haynes (born October 5, 1984) is a two-time Olympic swimmer from Barbados. He represented Barbados at the 2004 and 2008 Olympics. He currently resides in Toronto, as a member of the Varsity Blues swim team at the University of Toronto.

He holds the Barbadian record in the 50m and 100m freestyle events.

References

Haynes bio from the 2008 Olympics website.
Haynes bio from www.sports-reference.com.

1984 births
Living people
Swimmers from Toronto
Barbadian male swimmers
Canadian male freestyle swimmers
Swimmers at the 2004 Summer Olympics
Swimmers at the 2008 Summer Olympics
Olympic swimmers of Barbados
Swimmers at the 2007 Pan American Games
Pan American Games competitors for Barbados
Swimmers at the 2002 Commonwealth Games
Commonwealth Games competitors for Barbados
Competitors at the 2006 Central American and Caribbean Games
University of Toronto alumni
Canadian people of Barbadian descent
Black Canadian sportspeople